Joseph A. Bennett (28 March 1968 – 15 April 2015) was an English television, film, and theatre actor.

Early life and education

Bennett was born in London, England in 1968. He trained at the Central School of Speech and Drama in London.

Career 
He was one of two actors (the other being Douglas Henshall) who portrayed T.E. Lawrence in The Young Indiana Jones Chronicles. He was also in various other TV shows and films, including The Bill, Boon and Howards End.

Personal life

He was married to the actress Julie Graham from 2002. Bennett reportedly hanged himself in Richmond Park in April 2015. He was 47.

Filmography

Film

Television

References

External links

1968 births
2015 deaths
Male actors from London
English male film actors
English male stage actors
English male television actors
Alumni of the Royal Central School of Speech and Drama
Suicides by hanging in England
2015 suicides